Sanfilippo syndrome, also known as mucopolysaccharidosis type III (MPS III), is a rare autosomal recessive lysosomal storage disease that primarily affects the brain and spinal cord. It is caused by a buildup of large sugar molecules called glycosaminoglycans (AKA GAGs, or mucopolysaccharides) in the body's lysosomes.

Affected children generally do not show any signs or symptoms at birth, although some early indicators can be respiratory issues at birth, large head size, and umbilical hernia. In early childhood, they begin to develop developmental disability and loss of previously learned skills. In later stages of the disorder, they may develop seizures and movement disorders. Patients with Sanfilippo syndrome usually live into adolescence or early adulthood.

Signs and symptoms
The disease manifests in young children. Symptoms usually begin to appear between two and six years of age. Affected infants appear normal, although some mild facial dysmorphism may be noticeable. Of all of the MPS diseases, Sanfilippo syndrome produces the fewest physical anomalies.
After an initial symptom-free interval, patients usually present with a slowing of development and/or behavioural problems, followed by progressive intellectual decline resulting in severe dementia and progressive motor disease. Acquisition of speech is often slow and incomplete.

The disease progresses to increasing behavioral disturbance including temper tantrums, hyperactivity, destructiveness, aggressive behavior, pica, difficulties with toilet training, and sleep disturbance. As affected children initially have normal muscle strength and mobility, the behavioral disturbances may be difficult to manage. Disordered sleep in particular presents a significant problem to care providers.

In the final phase of the illness, children become increasingly immobile and unresponsive, often require wheelchairs, and develop swallowing difficulties and seizures. The life-span of an affected child does not usually extend beyond late teens to early twenties.

Individuals with MPS type III tend to have mild skeletal anomalies; osteonecrosis of the femoral head may be present in severe cases. Optic nerve atrophy, deafness, and otitis can be seen in moderate to severe cases. Other characteristics include coarse facial features, thick lips, synophrys, and stiff joints.

It is difficult to clinically distinguish differences among the four types of Sanfilippo syndrome. However, type A is usually the most severe subtype, characterized by earliest onset, rapid clinical progression with severe symptoms, and short survival. The median age of death for children afflicted with type A is 15.4 ± 4.1 years.

It is important that simple and treatable conditions such as ear infections and toothaches not be overlooked because of behavior problems that make examination difficult. Children with MPS type III often have an increased tolerance to pain. Bumps, bruises, or ear infections that would be painful for other children often go unnoticed in children with MPS type III. Some children with MPS type III may have a blood-clotting problem during and after surgery.

Genetics
Mutations in four different genes can lead to Sanfilippo syndrome. This disorder is inherited in an autosomal recessive pattern. People with two working copies of the gene are unaffected. People with one working copy are genetic carriers of Sanfilippo syndrome. They have no symptoms but may pass down the defective gene to their children. People with two defective copies will suffer from Sanfilippo syndrome.

Mechanism

Glycosaminoglycans (GAGs) are chains of sugar molecules. They are found in the extracellular matrix and the cell membrane, or stored in the secretory granules. GAGs are stored in the cell lysosome, and are degraded by enzymes such as glycosidases, sulfatases, and acetyltransferases. Deficiency in these enzymes lead to the four subtypes of MPS III.

Diagnosis

Sanfilippo syndrome types A, B, C, and D are considered to be clinically indistinguishable, although mutations in different genes are responsible for each disease. The following discussion is therefore applicable to all four conditions.

A urinalysis can show elevated levels of heparan sulfate in the urine. All four types of Sanfilippo syndrome show increased levels of GAGs in the urine; however, this is less true of Sanfilippo syndrome than other MPS disorders. Additionally, urinary GAG levels are higher in infants and toddlers than in older children. In order to avoid a false negative urine test due to dilution, it is important that a urine sample be taken first thing in the morning.

The diagnosis may be confirmed by enzyme assay of skin fibroblasts and white blood cells. The enzyme assay is considered to be the most credible diagnostic tool because it detects whether or not the enzymes that are normally present in the cellular pathway that is responsible for breaking down heparan sulfate are present or not, thereby providing a definitive answer. This test is also ideal for younger patients in which collecting a viable urine sample is difficult or impossible. Another diagnostic tool can be gene sequencing. However, if the genetic mutation they carry has never been seen or recorded, the patient would receive a false negative.

Prenatal diagnosis is possible by chorionic villus sampling or amniocentesis.

Treatments 
Treatment remains largely supportive. The behavioral disturbances of MPS-III respond poorly to medication. If an early diagnosis is made, bone marrow replacement may be beneficial. Although the missing enzyme can be manufactured and given intravenously, it cannot penetrate the blood–brain barrier and therefore cannot treat the neurological manifestations of the disease. Along with many other lysosomal storage diseases, MPS-III exists as a model of a monogenetic disease involving the central nervous system.

Several promising therapies are in development. The French company Lysogene is conducting a phase II/III clinical trial of a gene therapy-based treatment. Other potential therapies include chemical modification of deficient enzymes to allow them to penetrate the blood–brain barrier, stabilisation of abnormal but active enzyme to prevent its degradation, and implantation of stem cells strongly expressing the missing enzyme. For any future treatment to be successful, it must be administered as early as possible. Currently MPS-III is mainly diagnosed clinically, by which stage it is probably too late for any treatment to be very effective. Neonatal screening programs would provide the earliest possible diagnosis.

The flavonoid genistein decreases the accumulation of GAGs. In vitro, animal studies and clinical experiments suggest that the symptoms of the disease may be alleviated by an adequate dose of genistein. Despite its reported beneficial properties, genistein also has toxic side effects.

Several support and research groups have been established to speed the development of new treatments for Sanfilippo syndrome.

Participants in the first-ever "Caregiver Preference Study for Sanfilippo Syndrome" advocated for clinical trials that shift focus from primary cognitive outcomes to other multisystem endpoints, and perceptions of non-curative therapies revealed a preference for treatment options that stop or slow the disorder progression to maintain the child’s current function to ensure quality of life; thus, parents express high risk tolerance and a desire for broader inclusion criteria for trials.

Prognosis
According to a study of patients with Sanfilippo syndrome, the median life expectancy varies depending on the subtype. In Sanfilippo syndrome type A, the mean age at death (± standard deviation) was 15.22 ± 4.22 years. For type B, it was 18.91 ± 7.33 years, and for type C it was 23.43 ± 9.47 years. The mean life expectancy for type A has increased since the 1970s.

Epidemiology
Incidence of Sanfilippo syndrome varies geographically, with approximately 1 case per 280,000 live births in Northern Ireland, 1 per 66,000 in Australia, and 1 per 50,000 in the Netherlands.

The Australian study estimated the following incidence for each subtype of Sanfilippo syndrome:

History
The condition is named after Sylvester Sanfilippo, the pediatrician who first described the disease in 1963.

Caregiver impact
Caregivers for children with Sanfilippo syndrome face a unique set of challenges because of the disease's complex nature. There is little understanding among clinicians of the family experience of caring for patients with Sanfilippo and how a caregiver's experiences change and evolve as patients age. The burden and impact on caregivers' quality of life is poorly defined and best-practice guidance for clinicians is lacking.

A best-practice guidance to help clinicians understand the challenges caregivers face was published July 2019 in the Orphanet Journal of Rare Diseases by a group of international clinical advisors with expertise in the care of pediatric patients with Sanfilippo, lysosomal storage disorders, and life as a caregiver to a child with Sanfilippo.

The group reviewed key aspects of caregiver burden associated with Sanfilippo B by identifying and quantifying the nature and impact of the disease on patients and caregivers. Recommendations were based on findings from qualitative and quantitative research.

The article's authors reported, "Providing care for patients with Sanfilippo B impinges on all aspects of family life, evolving as the patient ages and the disease progresses. Important factors contributing toward caregiver burden include sleep disturbances, impulsive and hyperactive behavior, and communication difficulties ... Caregiver burden remained high throughout the life of the patient and, coupled with the physical burden of daily care, had a cumulative impact that generated significant psychological stress."

Additionally, the authors call for changing the narrative associated with Sanfilippo: "The panel agreed that the perceived aggressive behavior of the child may be better described as 'physical impulsiveness' and is often misunderstood by the general public. Importantly, the lack of intentionality of the child’s behavior is recognized and shared by parents and panel members ... Parents may seek to protect their child from public scrutiny and avoid situations that may engender criticism of their parenting skills."

Society and culture 
The community of Sanfilippo families, foundations, scientists and researchers, and industry partners and collaborators around the world have dedicated November 16 as World Sanfilippo Awareness Day. 

World Sanfilippo Awareness Day is about spreading awareness and sparking conversations globally about Sanfilippo syndrome. This day of awareness is in honor of the children around the world living with Sanfilippo syndrome today, and those who have died. It also honors the families of the children with Sanfilippo syndrome. November 16, 2019, was the first year observing World Sanfilippo Awareness Day.

See also
 Mucopolysaccharidosis
 Hurler syndrome (MPS I)
 Hunter syndrome (MPS II)
 Morquio syndrome (MPS IV)
 List of neurological conditions and disorders

References

External links
 

Autosomal recessive disorders
Proteoglycan metabolism disorders
Rare diseases
Syndromes with craniofacial abnormalities
Syndromes with intellectual disability
Syndromes affecting the nervous system
Rare syndromes